Montagna may refer to:

Places
Montan (Italian: Montagna), municipality in the South of South Tyrol in northern Italy
Brindisi Montagna, town and comune in the province of Potenza, in the Southern Italian region of Basilicata
San Zeno di Montagna, comune in the Province of Verona in the Italian region Veneto
Montagna dei Fiori, mountain group in the Abruzzo, central Italy
Montagna di Vernà (1287 m), peak of the Peloritani Mountains, located in the province of Messina, Sicily
Montagna in Valtellina, comune in the Province of Sondrio in the Italian region Lombardy
Montagna-le-Reconduit, commune in the Jura department in Franche-Comté in eastern France
Montagna-le-Templier, former commune in the Jura department in Bourgogne-Franche-Comté in eastern France

People
Bartolomeo Montagna (1450–1523), Italian painter and architect
Benedetto Montagna (c.1480–1555/1558), Italian engraver and painter
Bull Montana  (1887–1950), aka Lewis Montagna, born Luigi Montagna, was an Italian-American professional wrestler
Ezequiel Montagna (born 1994), Argentine professional footballer
Leigh Montagna (born 1983), Australian rules footballer 
Leonardo Montagna (1425/1426–1484), Italian humanist poet
Paolo Montagna (born 1976), Sammarinese footballer
Salvatore Montagna (1971–2011), boss of the Bonanno crime family in New York City
William Montagna (1913–1994), Italian-American dermatological researcher and professor

Other
Ferrari 212 E Montagna, sports racing car produced by Ferrari in 1968
Ecomuseo della Montagna Pistoiese (Ecomuseum of the Pistoian Mountain Region), museum in the Province of Pistoia, Italy
Rossignola di Montagna, wine grape
Podolica abruzzese di montagna, extinct breed of domestic cattle from the Abruzzo region of southern Italy
La montagna del dio cannibale (The Mountain of the Cannibal God), 1979 Italian cult movie starring Ursula Andress and Stacy Keach

See also
Montana (disambiguation)

Italian toponymic surnames